Luigi Negri, (4 August 1956) is an Italian architect and politician, exponent of the Lombard League and the Northern League. He served as member of the Italian Chamber of Deputies from 1992 to 2001. His passion for the history of art led him to deepen above all the study of porcelain and to collect them.

At the start of the 13th legislature, the President of the Chamber Luciano Violante invited him, along with a group of other architects deputies, to work out a project for the reorganization of Piazza Montecitorio.

Notes

External links 
 Parliamentar works of Luigi Negri
 On. Luigi Negri on Open Polis

1956 births
People from Codogno
Deputies of Legislature XI of Italy
Deputies of Legislature XII of Italy
Deputies of Legislature XIII of Italy
Lega Nord politicians
Politicians of Lombardy
Architects from Lombardy
Italian antiquarians
Polytechnic University of Milan alumni
Living people